Baisha is a town of Guiping, Guangxi, China. , it has 14 villages under its administration.

References

Towns of Guangxi
Guiping